Oviedo  is one of 8 comarcas of the province and autonomous community of Asturias in Spain.

The comarca is formed by 21 municipalities (municipios). From east to west they are:

Cabranes
Nava
Sariego
Bimenes
Sieru
Noreña
Oviedo
Llanera
Las Regueras
Ribera de Arriba
Morcín
Riosa
Santo Adriano
Grado
Quirós
Teverga
Proaza
Yernes y Tameza
Somiedo
Salas
Miranda

Comarcas of Asturias